Elections to Hastings Borough Council were held on 2 May 2002. The whole council was up for election with boundary changes since the last election in 2000. The Labour Party kept overall control of the council. Overall turnout was 32.0%.

After the election, the composition of the council was:
Labour 21
Conservative 10
Liberal Democrat 1

Election result

Ward results

References
2002 Hastings election result
Ward results

2002
2002 English local elections
2000s in East Sussex